J. Smith may refer to:

People
 J. Smith (1840s cricketer) (fl. 1840s), English cricketer
 J. Smith (footballer) (fl. 1889–1890), English footballer
 J. Smith (Gentlemen cricketer, 1833), English cricketer
 J. Smith (VC) (1822–1866), English recipient of the Victoria Cross
 J. D. Smith (offensive tackle) (born 1936)
 J. L. Smith (fl. 1953), American pitcher 
 J. L. B. Smith (1897–1968), South African ichthyologist
 J. R. Smith (born 1985), American basketball player
 J. T. Smith (American football) (born 1955), American football wide receiver

Other uses
 "J. Smith" (song), 2008 song by Travis from the album Ode to J. Smith

See also 
 J. Alfred Smith (born 1931), American pastor
 J. Beverley Smith (born 1931), Welsh historian
 J Carington Smith (1908–1972), Australian artist
 J. Eric Smith (born 1957), President of Swiss Re Americas
 J. L. Smith (Hualapai Smith) (c. 1817–1887), Forty-Niner and Arizona pioneer
 J. L. Smith (politician) (died 1867), mayor of Dallas, Texas
 J. Waldo Smith (1861–1933), American civil engineer
 J. Walter Smith (1869–1931), American magazine editor
 J. William Smith (1868–1937), Canadian politician
 J. A. Smith (disambiguation)
 J. D. Smith (disambiguation)
 J. H. Smith (disambiguation)
 J. J  Smith (disambiguation)
 JP Smith (disambiguation)
 J.T. Smith (disambiguation)
 James Smith (disambiguation)
 Jay Smith (disambiguation)
 John Smith (disambiguation)
 E. J. Smith (disambiguation)
 Smith (disambiguation)
 List of people with surname Smith

Smith, J.